Kuppathu Raja is a 2019 Indian Tamil-language action comedy-drama film written and directed by choreographer Baba Bhaskar. The film stars Parthiban, G. V. Prakash Kumar, Palak Lalwani and Poonam Bajwa, with Yogi Babu in supporting roles. The background score and soundtrack were composed by Prakash Kumar, while cinematography was dealt by Mahesh Muthuswami and editing was managed by Praveen. The film began pre-production in March 2017. Kuppathu Raja is produced by Saravanan, Siraj and Saravanan under the banner S FOCUSS production.

Premise
The movie is about the relationships between a few slum dwellers and how some antisocial elements create unrest in their lives. The slum is dominated by a five-member gang headed by MG Rajendran (Parthiban), a do-gooder and hardcore fan of MGR. The people there look up to him, and he has the final say in everything. Rocket (G. V. Prakash Kumar) is the son of Rajendran's aide Oor Niyayam (M. S. Bhaskar). He has a devil-may-care attitude and is in love with Kamala (Palak Lalwani), another girl from the slum. When the couple dreams of a life together, Mary (Poonam Bajwa), a new resident to the slum, changes their lives. Meanwhile, a series of untoward incidents disrupt the peaceful lives in the slum. Later that,seth is revealed as the mastermind behind the crimes. Rajendran and rocket avenge all the deaths in their areas by killing all the goons and finally seth & hanging him staging it like a suicide . Rocket gets stabbed by Seth's other goons . However three days later he miraculously survives and finally Raj blesses rocket and his girlfriend telling them though rocket's father passed away , Rocket can consider him as his fatherfigure.

Cast

Parthiban as M. G. Rajendran
G. V. Prakash Kumar as Rocket
Palak Lalwani as Kamala
Poonam Bajwa as Mary
Yogi Babu as Kai Saamman
M. S. Bhaskar as Oor Niyayam, Rocket's father
R. N. R. Manohar as Kai Saamman's father
D. R. K. Kiran as Daas
Jangiri Madhumitha as Kamala's friend
Baboos as Mastan Bhai
Rahul Thatha as Antony
Vijayamuthu as Ghilli
Karnaraja as Dhina
Hemarnath as Bandari Seth
Sathish Kanna
Shanthi Mani
Chandrasekar

Production
Choreographer Baba Bhaskar announced his first film as a director in September 2016 and cast G. V. Prakash Kumar in the lead role. Cinematographer Mahesh Muthuswami, editor Praveen K. L. and art director Kiran were also revealed to form a part of the technical crew. The film was revealed to have two lead actresses. Poonam Bajwa is roped in to play a role of Anglo-Indian in the film. The film began production in late March 2017, with the title Kuppathu Raja named after Rajinikanth's 1979 film of same name announced and actor Parthiban joining the team.

Release
The movie was released worldwide on 5 April 2019 and received mixed reviews from critics.

Soundtrack
The soundtrack was composed by G. V. Prakash Kumar.

All lyrics written by Logan.

References

External links

2019 films
2010s Tamil-language films
Films scored by G. V. Prakash Kumar
Indian comedy-drama films
2019 comedy-drama films